Gibraltar is a 1964 thriller film directed by Pierre Gaspard-Huit and starring Hildegard Knef, Gérard Barray, Geneviève Grad and Elisa Montés. It was made as a co-production between France, Italy and Spain. The film's were designed by the art director Francisco Canet.

Synopsis
A secret agent goes undercover to infiltrate smugglers between Tangiers and Gibraltar.

Cast
 Hildegard Knef as Elinor van Berg 
 Gérard Barray as Frank Jackson
 Geneviève Grad as Cathy Maxwell
 Elisa Montés as Lola
 Claudio Gora as General Maxwell
 Fausto Tozzi as Paoli
 Bernard Dhéran as Harry Williams
 Jacques Seiler as 	Kovacks
 José Marco Davó as Prestamista
 Silvia Solar as Miriam
 Luis Induni as Admiral
 Jean Ozenne as 	Thomas Barnett
 Antonio Molino Rojo as Thug
 Frank Braña as Thug

See also
Gibraltar (1938)
The Sharks of Gibraltar (1947)

References

External links
 

1964 films
1960s spy thriller films
French spy thriller films
Italian spy thriller films
Spanish spy thriller films
1960s French-language films
Films directed by Pierre Gaspard-Huit
Remakes of French films
Films set in the British Empire
Films set in the Mediterranean Sea
1960s French films
1960s Italian films